Djibloho – Ciudad de la Paz, formerly Oyala, is a city in Equatorial Guinea that is being built to replace Malabo as the national capital. Established as an urban district in Wele-Nzas in 2015, it is now the administrative headquarters of Djibloho, Equatorial Guinea's newest province created in 2017, and is located near the town of Mengomeyén. In 2017, the city was officially renamed Ciudad de la Paz ("City of Peace").

The planned city's location was chosen for its easy access and benign climate. It is notably on the mainland, in contrast to Malabo, which is on the island of Bioko. It was designed by the Portuguese Studio for Architecture and Urbanism FAT – Future Architecture Thinking. It is projected to have around 200,000 inhabitants, a new Parliament building, a number of presidential villas and an area of 8150 hectares. The construction of this new capital has been criticised by the political opposition to President Teodoro Obiang, the driving force behind the initiative. The Government of Equatorial Guinea began to move to the city in early 2017.

Geography

Location
Oyala – Ciudad de la Paz is located near the centre of Río Muni, the continental part of Equatorial Guinea. It is located between the cities of Bata and Mongomo and 20 km from the airport of Mengomeyén. The power supply relies upon the 120 MW Djibloho Dam in the district Djibloho Evinayong.

Climate
Oyala – Ciudad de la Paz has a tropical climate that borders between a tropical monsoon climate and a tropical savannah climate. It has high overall rainfall, averaging 2142 mm a year, which supports the lush rainforests in the region. There is an extensive wet season, spanning 10 months of the year from September to June, and a brief and slightly cooler dry season covering the remaining two months, July and August. There is also a noticeably drier, though still wet, stretch in December and January. Temperatures remain very warm throughout the course of the year, albeit lower than one might expect in other places with the same climate, especially considering its proximity to the equator.

Planning and construction
In the middle of the undeveloped forest, the government plans to build a new city as the future seat of government. It will be the headquarters of the president, government, administration, police and military leadership and replace the current capital Malabo. The city is being designed to house 160,000–200,000 people, living in an area of 81.5 km2. This corresponds to about a quarter of the population of Equatorial Guinea.

A golf course, a university, and a luxury hotel were finished in 2013 and a six-lane highway is almost complete. In planning are government buildings, a financial district and residential areas. Three bridges and highways have been completed or are under construction.  There will be a connection between the city and the new airport in Mengomeyen (the home of the president). The strategic importance of the port city of Bata will be developed for the neighbouring Gabon and for Central Africa. For the highways, huge swaths of forest were cleared and lanes blown up. The Portuguese Chamber of Commerce (AICEP) said the city should use renewable energy and be sustainable.

Funding is provided through the AICEP. The plans come from a Portuguese architectural office. The construction work will be supported by China, Poland, Brazil and North Korea. Construction faces delays such as, according to unconfirmed reports, President Obiang ordered a building to be moved because he did not like the view. Additionally, all materials are imported.

Urban design
The city was designed by the Portuguese urban architecture FAT – Future Architecture Thinking. Estimates of its ultimate population size have been revised from 65,000 initially to between 160,000 and 200,000.

The city will be built on an area of 8,150 hectares  (81.5 km2 or 20,100 acres) According to FAT, the Djibloho project "combines modernity and respect for the cultural roots of the country, promoting local identity and the richness of the ecosystem in which it operates, prioritizing sustainability in the most varied aspects" stressing that "this project aims to create the first global capital entirely dependent on renewable and sustainable energy."

Progress
In 2021, a video sponsored by the China State Construction group, which is part of the building consortium, showed what appeared to be an overpass of completed, but not yet functioning, highways to Oyala, Bata, Mongomo and Mengomeyén airport. The video continued showing viewers around parts of the new city, where work on a six-storey cylindrical tower-building for the ministry of infrastructure remained partly built, and most other structures appeared far less advanced.

However, 2022 videos show two glass towers, the gateway to the campus of the Afro-American University of Central Africa, several administrative style buildings and the Grand Hotel Djibloho all appearing functionally complete. The 380-room hotel has a golf course, wellness centre and facilities for conferences as large as 1200 people, though its own website describes itself as being surrounded by tropical forest, which suggests that it is not in the heart of a city.

Participating companies 
 Director of planning, roads, highways and urban network diagram: CSCEC, Vinci SA, Egis Route
 Perimeter Highway: ARG
 Bridges: Bouygues, Besix, Vinci SA, General Works
 Buildings: CSCEC, Piccini
 Universities: Unicon
 Regional parliament: Summa
 Presidential palace: Seguibat
 Ministry buildings: CSCEC

See also
 List of purpose-built national capitals

References

External links
 
 Ateliê português desenha futura capital da Guiné Equatorial

2015 establishments in Equatorial Guinea
Populated places in Djibloho
Planned capitals
Proposed populated places
Populated places established in 2015